Nicholas Alexander McCormack Clark (born 3 June 1991) is a Scottish professional footballer who plays as a striker for St Johnstone. Clark is the son of the former Airdrieonians, Hearts, Rangers and West Ham striker Sandy Clark.

Career

Early career
Clark began his career with the youth team of Rangers but was released at 15 and joined Aberdeen. He appeared as an unused substitute during the 2008–09 season and in early 2009, Clark signed a contract extension with the club.

Peterhead
To gain first team experience, Clark joined Peterhead on loan until January. Clark made his debut for the club on 19 September 2009, where he came on as a substitute in the 74th minute as Peterhead drew 1–1 with Arbroath. Clark's loan spell with Peterhead was extended until the end of the 2009–10 season. In the 2009–10 season, Clark would make twenty-five appearances and score four times. Clark, along with Jonathan Crawford, was released by the club after being told they wouldn't be offered a new contract.

After being released by Aberdeen, Clark joined Peterhead permanently in August 2010. Like his loan spell, Clark continued to be a first team regular for the club, where he made twenty-nine appearances and scored four times.

Queen of the South
He moved to Queen of the South in July 2011, signing a one-year contract extension in May 2012. The first season with Queen of the South was a struggle for Clark, as he failed to score his first goal, though it eventually happened in the second round of Scottish League Cup against Forfar Athletic.

The 2012–13 season was an improvement and breakthrough season for Clark after his dad, Sandy, joined the club as an assistant manager and he formed a striking partnership with Derek Lyle. Clark would score 41 goals in 46 appearances in all competitions, including scoring two hat-tricks against Stranraer and Forfar Athletic. Clark also played a role in winning the Challenge Cup Final when he scored the opener before Partick Thistle equalised, leading to a penalty shootout. Queen of the South would win the penalty shootout 6–5 to lift the cup. With the club also winning the Second Division, this gained the club their inaugural league and cup double.

Clark was the SFL Division 2 Player of the Year for the 2012–13 season, and he also won the Ginger Boot Award for being the top scorer across all four Scottish divisions. Clark was also named in the PFA Scotland Team of the Year for the Second Division alongside team-mates Chris Mitchell, Mark Durnan, Chris Higgins, Daniel Carmichael and Lee Robinson.

Rangers
In May 2013 he signed a three-year contract with Rangers, effective from 1 September 2013. The move was successful after Clark started talks with Ally McCoist. Ahead of the 2013–14 season, Clark expressed the opinion that playing in the Scottish League One would not be easy.

Clark scored on his debut on 31 August 2013 after 30 seconds, as Rangers won 5–0 against East Fife, just one day before the end of the club's transfer embargo. After the match, Clark said he believed the club could score 100 goals by the end of the season after scoring 18 goals at such an early stage. Clark initially struggled to make an impact, as he was often on the bench. This led to the Evening Times questioning whether Clark should become a first team starter. This continued until he scored four goals in a 6–1 win over Forfar Athletic on 3 December 2013. In the second half of the season, Clark suffered a broken foot that kept him out for five weeks. After his return, Clark scored in a 2–1 win over Brechin City on 23 March 2014.

On 3 May, Rangers became the first side in 116 years to go an entire league season unbeaten after a 1–1 draw with Dunfermline during which they clinched the Scottish League One championship. On 28 December 2015, Clark scored in the 65th minute in a crucial match against Hibernian, which put Rangers three points clear of Hibs.

On 23 May 2016, Clark was released by Rangers.

Bury
On 25 June 2016, Clark signed for Football League One side Bury on a two-year deal. Clark made his debut for Bury in a 2–0 victory over Charlton on 6 August 2016. However, after Bury signed James Vaughan from Birmingham City, Clark was deemed surplus to requirement and allowed to leave Gigg Lane, having made only four competitive appearances.

Dunfermline Athletic
Clark returned to Scotland after two months in England, signing for Scottish Championship side Dunfermline Athletic in August 2016 on a two-year deal. His move to the Pars saw Clark team up with his former manager at Queen of the South, Allan Johnston, as well as his father Sandy Clark who was also assistant to Johnston at the Doonhamers. Clark spent two seasons with the Pars, finishing top goalscorer for the club in both seasons, scoring 16 goals in his first and 21 goals in his second.

Dundee United
On 23 May 2018, after opting not to extend his contract with Dunfermline Athletic, Clark joined fellow Scottish Championship club Dundee United on a two-year contract. In his first season, he scored 15 goals in 36 competitive first team games.

During the 2019–20 season Clark played in a deeper role in the side. He signed an extended contract in January 2020, despite having suffered an ankle injury that required surgery.

On 14 January 2021, Clark signed a new contract with Dundee United, keeping him at the club until 2023.

St Johnstone
On 31 August 2022, Clark signed for St Johnstone for an undisclosed fee.

Personal life
Clark was born in Bellshill and his father is the former Airdrieonians, Heart of Midlothian and Rangers striker, Sandy Clark.

Career statistics

Honours
Queen of the South
Scottish Challenge Cup: 2012–13
Scottish Second Division: 2012–13

Rangers
Scottish Championship: 2015–16
Scottish League One: 2013–14
Scottish Challenge Cup: 2015–16

Dundee United
Scottish Championship: 2019–20

References

External links
 

1991 births
Living people
Scottish footballers
Association football midfielders
Association football forwards
Aberdeen F.C. players
Peterhead F.C. players
Queen of the South F.C. players
Rangers F.C. players
Bury F.C. players
Dunfermline Athletic F.C. players
Dundee United F.C. players
St Johnstone F.C. players
Scottish Professional Football League players
Scottish Football League players
English Football League players